Senator Isaacs may refer to:

Benjamin Isaacs (1778–1846), Connecticut State Senate
Elijah Isaacs (died 1799), North Carolina State Senate